Todd Lowber (born January 26, 1982) is a former gridiron football wide receiver. He most recently played for the Toronto Argonauts of the Canadian Football League (CFL). He was signed by the Minnesota Vikings as an undrafted free agent in 2007. He has also been a member of the New York Giants, Dallas Cowboys, and Miami Dolphins. He earned a Super Bowl ring as a member of the Giants' practice squad in Super Bowl XLII. He did not play college football but is a former college basketball player and high jump champion.

Lowber grew up in Delran Township, New Jersey and attended Delran High School.

College career
Lowber played basketball for two seasons at Ramapo College in Mahwah, New Jersey as a guard and won the 2006 NCAA Division III men's high jump. Prior to transferring to Ramapo, Lowber played two seasons for Richard Stockton College of New Jersey.

Professional football career

Minnesota Vikings
On April 18, 2007, Lowber signed a three-year contract with the Minnesota Vikings. They signed Lowber after their scout attended a combine that was set up by New Jersey sports attorney Jim Ulrich. Prior to signing with the Vikings, Lowber had no previous football experience. Lowber was waived on August 27, 2007.

New York Giants
He was signed to the New York Giants practice squad in September 2007. He was released by the team on June 23, 2008.

First stint with the Toronto Argonauts
Lowber was signed to the practice roster of the CFL's Toronto Argonauts on July 22, 2008.

Dallas Cowboys
Shortly after signing with the Argonauts, Lowber was signed by the Dallas Cowboys on July 28, 2008. His attempt to make the Cowboys was chronicled on the HBO series Hard Knocks: Training Camp with the Dallas Cowboys. On August 30, Lowber was waived from the Cowboys during final cuts.

Miami Dolphins
Lowber was signed to the practice squad of the Miami Dolphins on November 10, 2008. After finishing the season on the practice squad, he was re-signed by the Dolphins on January 5, 2009. He was waived on June 1, 2009.

Second stint with the Toronto Argonauts
Lowber re-signed with the Toronto Argonauts on June 7, 2009. On June 14, 2009, Lowber suffered a concussion after being hit by Chris Jennings and Doug Goldsby of the Montreal Alouettes while returning a kick in the team's first pre-season game. Lowber lay on the field for 15 minutes before getting carted away. He was released on June 23, 2009.

Third stint with the Toronto Argonauts
On April 21, 2011, Lowber re-signed with the Toronto Argonauts. He was later released on June 20, 2011.

References

External links
Toronto Argonauts bio
Miami Dolphins bio
New York Giants bio

1982 births
Living people
American men's basketball players
Point guards
Shooting guards
Players of American football from Camden, New Jersey
Ramapo Roadrunners men's basketball players
Stockton Ospreys men's basketball players
American football wide receivers
American players of Canadian football
Canadian football wide receivers
Minnesota Vikings players
New York Giants players
Toronto Argonauts players
Dallas Cowboys players
Miami Dolphins players
Delran High School alumni
People from Delran Township, New Jersey
Sportspeople from Burlington County, New Jersey